Chumpe (possibly from Quechua chumpi: belt), Jatunriti, Ñanaloma or Yanaloma is a mountain in the Vilcanota mountain range in the Andes of Peru with  of elevation. It is located in the Cusco Region, Canchis Province, Pitumarca District as well as in the Quispicanchi Province, Ocongate District. Chumpe lies north of Lake Sibinacocha.

See also 

 Aquichua
 Huarurumicocha

References 

Mountains of Peru
Mountains of Cusco Region
Glaciers of Peru
Six-thousanders of the Andes